The Witness for the Prosecution and Other Stories is a short story collection written by Agatha Christie and first published in the US by Dodd, Mead and Company in 1948. The first edition retailed at $2.50. The story "The Second Gong" features Hercule Poirot, the only character in the stories who appears in any other of Christie's works.

Each story has also appeared in either of the UK collections The Hound of Death, The Listerdale Mystery or Problem at Pollensa Bay and Other Stories and therefore this collection was not published in the UK. Some of the stories are fantasy fiction rather than mysteries.

List of stories 
"Accident"
"The Fourth Man"
"The Mystery of the Blue Jar"
"The Mystery of the Spanish Shawl" (a.k.a. "Mr. Eastwood's Adventure")
"Philomel Cottage"
"The Red Signal"
"The Second Gong"
"Sing a Song of Sixpence"
"S.O.S."
"Where There's a Will" (a.k.a. "Wireless")
"The Witness for the Prosecution"

Publication history

 1948, Dodd Mead and Company (New York), Hardcover, 272 pp
 1956, Dell Books, Paperback, (Dell number 855), 192 pp
 1984, Berkley Books, Paperback, (Berkley number 07997-X), 230 pp

First publication of stories in the US

The first US magazine publication of all the stories has not been fully documented. A partial listing is as follows:

 "The Mystery of the Blue Jar": a 1924 issue of Metropolitan Magazine.
 "The Witness for the Prosecution": 31 January 1925 issue of Flynn's Weekly (Volume IV, No 2) under the title Traitor's Hands with an uncredited illustration.
 "Where There's a Will": 1 March 1926 issue of Mystery Magazine under the title "Wireless".
 "The Second Gong": June 1932 (Volume LIIX, Number 6) issue of the Ladies Home Journal with an illustration by R.J. Prohaska.

In addition, the following were published unillustrated in Ellery Queen's Mystery Magazine:

 "Accident": March 1943 (Volume 4, Number 2)
 "Sing a Song of Sixpence": February 1947 (Volume 9, Number 39)
 "The Mystery of the Spanish Shawl": April 1947 (Volume 9, Number 41)
 "The Red Signal": June 1947 (Volume 9, Number 43)
 "The Fourth Man": October 1947 (Volume 10, Number 47)
 "S.O.S.": December 1947 (Volume 10, Number 49)

For first publications in the UK, see the applicable UK collections referenced above.

References

External links
The Witness for the Prosecution and Other Stories at the official Agatha Christie website

1948 short story collections
Short story collections by Agatha Christie
Hercule Poirot short story collections
Dodd, Mead & Co. books